Ajem-Turkic or Ajami Turkic ( Türkī-yi ʿacemī,  'Persian Turkic' or 'Persian Turkish';), also known as Middle Azeri, is used to refer to the Turkic vernacular spoken in Iran between the 15th and 18th century. The modern Azerbaijani language is descended from this language.

Name

The term is derived from earlier designations, such as lingua turcica agemica, or Turc Agemi, which was used in a grammar book composed by the French writer Capuchin Raphaël du Mans (died 1696) in 1684. Local texts simply called the language türkī. During "the Isfahan phase of the Safavids", it was called ḳızılbaşī in contrast to rūmī (Ottoman) and çaġatā’ī (Chagatai), due to its close relation to dialects spoken by the Qizilbash.

History
Ajem-Turkic is descended from Old Anatolian Turkish, and is part of the southwestern branch of Oghuz languages. The language first appears during the 15th-century in Azerbaijan, eastern Anatolia, and Iran. It went through more development under the Turkic dynasties of the Aq Qoyunlu (1378–1503) and the Qara Qoyunlu (1374–1468), and particularly in Safavid Iran (1501–1736), whose ruling dynasty stemmed from Azerbaijan. Under them, Ajem-Turkic, alongside Persian, was used at the court and in the military, and was a lingua franca from northern to southern Iran. According to Swedish Turkologist Lars Johanson, Ajemi Turkic was an "Azerbaijanian koiné" that functioned as lingua franca in the Caucasus region and in southeastern Dagestan, and was widely spoken at the court and in the army.

According to É. Á. Csató et al.:

Literature
Since its appearance, Ajem-Turkic was heavily impacted by Persian, especially in its syntax. The Persian design of merging clauses which Ajem-Turkic had inherited from Old Anatolian Turkish was strengthened due to its continuous contact with Persian.

Sources for the study of Ajemi-Turkic include the prose texts of Nishati (fl. 1530–after 1557), the Tarih-i Hatai (Tārīkh-i Khatāʾī, 1494/95); Şühedaname (Şühedānāme, 1539); and Tezkire-i Şeyh Safi (Tedhkire-i Şeykh Ṣafī, 1542/43).

References

Sources

Further reading 
 
 
 

Azerbaijani language
Extinct languages of Asia
Languages attested from the 15th century
Oghuz languages
Lingua francas